Table tennis was first included in the Olympic program at the 1988 Summer Olympics in Seoul, with four events contested.

Participating nations
A total of 129 athletes (81 men and 48 women), representing 41 NOCs, competed in four events.

Medal summary

Medal table

References

Sources
 
 International Table Tennis Federation (ITTF)
 

 
1988 Summer Olympics events
1988
1988 in table tennis